{{Infobox military conflict
| conflict          = Dano-Swedish Wars
| place             = Scandinavia, Baltic Sea, Livonia, Northern Germany
| combatant1        = 
 (to 1389)

 Kalmar Union (1389-1523)

 Denmark-Norway (from 1523)

Often supported by:
 Grand Duchy of Moscow / Tsardom of Russia / Russian Empire (from 1478)
 Kingdom of Poland / Polish–Lithuanian Commonwealth
 Hanseatic League (from 1523)
 First French Empire (1807-14)

| combatant2        = 
{{Coat of arms|Sweden|}} /  Sweden

Often supported by:
 Hanseatic League (to 1523)
 Holstein-Gottorp (1544-1721)
 Kingdom of France (1635-1789)

| date              = Prehistory to 1814 (Treaty of Kiel)
| result            = Dissolution of Kalmar UnionAnnexation of Skåneland, Bohuslän and Jämtland to Sweden Formation of Swedish-Norwegian Union
| image             = Bornhöft 1813.jpg
| caption           = The Battle of Bornhöved (1813), the last major battle between Danish and Swedish troops.
}}

Dano-Swedish War may refer to one of multiple wars which took place between the Kingdom of Sweden and the Kingdom of Denmark (from 1450 in personal union with the Kingdom of Norway) up to 1814:

 List of wars 
 Legendary wars between Denmark and Sweden 
Ohthere's Danish Raid, c.520
Battle of Brávellir, c.750
Olof the Brash's invasion of Denmark c.900
Battle of Fýrisvellir, 986

 Middle Ages (Denmark versus Sweden) 
Battle of Helgeå, 1026
Svend III Grathe's Swedish Raids, 1152–1154
Danish Interventions in the Sverker-Erik Wars:
Battle of Lena, 1208
Battle of Gestilren, 1210
Battle of Hova, 1275
The 6000-Mark War, 1276–1278
, 1318
, 1341–1343
Battle of Visby, 1361
, 1389

 Union Wars 
Engelbrekt rebellion, 1434–1439
Wars between King Christian and King Karl:
First War, 1448–1451
Second War, 1452–1457
Battle of Haraker, 1464
Wars between Union kings and Swedish regents:
Dano-Swedish War of 1470-1471
Battle of Rotebro, 1497. See also Russo-Swedish War of 1495–1497
Dano-Swedish War of 1501–1512

Swedish War of Liberation, 1521–1523

 Early Modern Period (Denmark-Norway versus Sweden) 
Count's Feud, 1534–1536
Northern Seven Years' War, 1563–1570. See also Livonian War.
Kalmar War, 1611–1613
Torstenson War, 1643–1645. Known in Norway as the Hannibal War.
First Bremen War, 1654
 Little Northern War:
First Karl Gustav War, 1657–1658
Second Karl Gustav War, 1658–1660. Known in Norway as the Bjelke War.
Second Bremen War, 1666
Scanian War, 1675–1679. Known in Norway as the Gyldenløve War.
Great Northern War:
First Danish Intervention, 1700. See Peace of Travendal.
Second Danish Intervention, 1709–1720. See 1716-19 Norwegian Campaigns & Treaty of Frederiksborg.
Theatre War, 1788–1789. Known in Norway as the Cowberry War''. See also Russo-Swedish War (1788–1790).
Danish-Swedish conflicts within the broader Napoleonic Wars:
Dano-Swedish War of 1808–1809
German Campaign of 1813, during the War of the Sixth Coalition.

See also
 Swedish–Norwegian War (1814)

References

Denmark–Sweden relations